Brian Culbertson (born January 12, 1973) is an American smooth jazz/R&B/funk musician and producer. His instruments include the synthesizer, piano and trombone.

Early life and career 
Culbertson was born in Decatur, Illinois. As a child, he was musically skilled, having started playing piano at age eight, drums at nine, trombone at ten, bass in seventh grade, and euphonium in high school.

Growing up, he listened to Sting, The Yellowjackets, George Duke, David Foster, Marcus Miller, David Sanborn, Chicago, and Earth, Wind and Fire. He attended and graduated MacArthur High School, where his father was a music teacher.
He then moved to Chicago where he attended DePaul University. It was in college that he actually started working on a CD, gathering a group of musicians, recording a demo tape and sending it to the only person he knew in Los Angeles, Bud Harner, who would get him his first record deal.

He is married to Michelle Culbertson, also known by her stage name Micaela Haley, and they live in Chicago. In an interview, Culbertson revealed that he met his wife in college through his first bass player Sharay Reed who had met Michelle at the World of Music Festival in Nashville, Tennessee where they both won awards at the age of 16. Michelle, originally a violinist, won for Best Concert Master and Sharay Reed for Best Soloist. They both were reintroduced to one another at DePaul University two years later. At the end of their Freshman year together Sharay introduced Michelle to Brian telling them that they would make a good match. His wife contributed background vocals on his earlier albums and a feature vocal on his Christmas CD, A Soulful Christmas.

Culbertson plays Mason & Hamlin pianos and Roland keyboards and has appeared at the NAMM Show.

In 2013, he announced on his blog that he was working on his fourteenth album, the album Another Long Night Out was released on February 25, 2014, and was going to revisit his earlier roots in contemporary jazz. In 2015, he released a second live album "20th Anniversary Tour" while performing at jazz club Yoshi's and, subsequently, he also released a solo piano album for yoga and meditation.

His latest album, released on April 10, 2020, is aptly titled XX (Roman numeral for 20) because it is his 20th solo record. Featuring many guests including Mr. Talkbox, Bootsy Collins, Avery*Sunshine, Marcus Anderson, Everette Harp, Noel Gourdin, Patches Stewart, Ray Parker Jr., Paul Jackson Jr., Jubu Smith, Nicholas Cole, and more, the XX album is genre-bending ride through tracks reminiscent of all of Brian's albums: Smooth Jazz, Funk, Gospel, Pop, R&B, and more.

Napa Valley Jazz Getaway 

In late 2011, Culbertson announced he would be hosting the first annual Brian Culbertson Napa Valley Jazz Getaway at the Napa Valley Opera House on June 7–10, 2012. Brian along with his wife, Michelle Culbertson (Micaela Haley) began working on the Napa Valley Jazz Getaway together after having spent their 10th wedding anniversary in the region. . The 4-day concert event would include live performances by comedian Sinbad, vocalists Oleta Adams and Kenny Lattimore, as well as artists Eric Marienthal, Eric Darius, and David Benoit.  In addition to performances, Culbertson curated the weekend's events to include food and wine events at his favorite Napa establishments including: Cindy Pawlcyn's Brassica restaurant, Miner Family Vineyards, Silver Oak Cellars, Caldwell-Snyder Art Gallery, and Silo's Napa.

The inaugural event was a commercial and critical success, selling out within a week of the public announcement of ticket sales. At the 2012 event, Culbertson announced that the event would return for a second year, held June 5–9, 2013.  The expanded 5-day 2013 event was held at the Napa Valley Opera House and the Lincoln Theater in addition to several wineries and featured Norman Brown, Kirk Whalum, Rick Braun, Larry Graham & Graham Central Station, Take 6, Ray Parker Jr., Eric Darius, Nick Colionne, Michael Lington, DW3, Cecil Ramirez and returning special guest comedian Sinbad.

Awards 
Culbertson has received numerous awards including a 2012 NAACP Image Award nomination for Best Jazz Album; 2012 Soul Train Award nomination for Best Contemporary Jazz Artist; Winning Six (6) 2011 Oasis Smooth Jazz Awards for Best Entertainer, Best Album "XII", Best Song "That's Life", Best Keyboardist, Best Male Artist and Best Collaboration "w/Earl Klugh"; 2010 Canadian Smooth Jazz Award for Best International Artist; 2010 American Smooth Jazz Award for Best Keyboardist; 2005 ASYM All That Jazz Award; 2001 National Smooth Jazz Award for Best Keyboardist.

Personal life 

Culbertson has been married since 1997.

Discography

Studio albums

Live albums

References

External links 
Official site
Facebook page
YouTube Channel
Napa Valley Jazz Getaway website
Profile on GRP Records

American jazz pianists
American male pianists
1973 births
Living people
Smooth jazz pianists
Musicians from Decatur, Illinois
DePaul University alumni
Jazz musicians from Illinois
21st-century American pianists
21st-century American male musicians
American male jazz musicians
20th-century American keyboardists
20th-century American male musicians